Lee Walker (born 7 February 1973) is a former Australian rules footballer who played with Collingwood in the Australian Football League (AFL).

Originally from Busselton, Walker represented Western Australia in the Teal Cup and was selected in the Under-18 All-Australian team. He was unable to make any senior appearances for the West Coast Eagles, due to a knee injury. Collingwood gave up the 12th selection of the 1994 AFL Draft to secure Walker, a pick which the Eagles used on Shane Sikora.

He continued to be hampered by injuries at Collingwood but was able to play 16 AFL games in three seasons. A key position player, he had a total of three knee reconstructions during his career. After being delisted he nominated for the 1998 AFL Draft and was re-signed by Collingwood, but he would only play reserves matches.

Since retiring, Walker has remained involved in football as both a Player Development Manager and as a player manager.

References

1973 births
Australian rules footballers from Western Australia
Collingwood Football Club players
East Perth Football Club players
Living people
People from Busselton